Santiago de Huamán, simply known as Huaman (from  meaning 'hawk') is a traditional village in Trujillo, Peru; it is located in the western part of the city in Víctor Larco Herrera. Currently its main attractions are the Baroque-style church and the Patron Festivities that are held every year in May or June.

History
Located in southwest Trujillo city, its territory was part of the Moche and Chimu cultures. It was later conquered by the Inca, who presumably gave it its name of Huaman, and subsequently seized by the Spanish.

The church of Santiago de Huamán, erected at the beginning of the 17th century, is without a doubt the oldest standing Catholic church in Trujillo. In the past it was dedicated to the Virgin of Mercy and was maintained by the Mercedarian friars.

Festivals
Patron Lord of Huaman
The origin of this tradition dates back more than 300 years. It is a religious festival that attracts pilgrims and tourists who visit the historic church of Santiago de Huaman. The celebration of the festival takes place from 13 to 27 May in honor of the Lord of Huaman; novenas, rosaries and confessions are offered by the faithful devotees. The celebrations also include morning and afternoon sports. On the event's main day, special celebrations are performed including flag hoisting, a solemn mass held by the Archbishop of Trujillo, a procession with the sacred image and the entrance into the church with a band of musicians. In one of the chests they discovered a priest's clothes, in the second the clothes of a saint, and in the third the holy image of the Lord in parts. They took everything to the town where they assembled and dressed the sacred image. One of the seamen upon waking said, "Lord Huaman, save us!" and thus named the saint. When the Bishop of Trujillo learned of the discovery, he ordered the construction of a chapel at the site but it was destroyed. It was later rebuilt and again destroyed; the natives and fishermen then decided to build the church in the village of Huaman.

Patron Lord of the Sea is celebrated after the Lord of Huaman Festival.

Tourism
Santiago de Huamán Church is located in the town's main square.
The Main Square is used for the festival of the Patron Lord of Huaman, as well as beauty contests.

Gallery

Geography

Climate

Principal streets
Huaman Avenue begins in the historic town.
Cesar vallejo Street is one of the streets in the main square.

See also

Historic Centre of Trujillo
Chan Chan
Huanchaco
Puerto Chicama
Chimu
Pacasmayo beach
Marcahuamachuco
Wiraquchapampa
Moche
Víctor Larco Herrera District
Vista Alegre
Buenos Aires
Las Delicias beach
La Libertad Region
Trujillo Province, Peru
Virú culture
Wall of Trujillo
Lake Conache
Marinera Festival
Trujillo Spring Festival
Wetlands of Huanchaco
Salaverry
Salaverry beach
Puerto Morín

References

External links

Location of Santiago de Huamán (Wikimapia)
"Huaca de la luna and Huaca del sol"
"Huacas del Sol y de la Luna Archaeological Complex", Official Website
Information on El Brujo Archaeological Complex
Chan Chan World Heritage Site, UNESCO
Chan Chan conservation project
Website about Trujillo, Reviews, Events, Business Directory

Multimedia
 
 
 
 Gallery pictures of Trujillo by Panoramio, Includes Geographical information by various authors
Colonial Trujillo photos

Localities of Trujillo, Peru